Jahanabad-e Sofla (also Romanized as Jahānābād-e Soflá; also known as Jahānābād-e Pā’īn) is a village in Qoroq Rural District, Baharan District, Gorgan County, Golestan Province, Iran. At the 2006 census, its population was 1,183, in 288 families.

References 

Populated places in Gorgan County